The Church of the Nazarene is a historic church located at 305 East 4th Street in Casa Grande, Arizona, in the United States. Built in 1949, it was added to the National Register of Historic Places, on November 20, 2002, as the Church of the Nazarene. It was listed for its architecture.  The church shows Spanish revival and Romanesque architectural styles.

It was included in the Casa Grande, Arizona Multiple Property Submission study.

See also
 List of historic properties in Casa Grande, Arizona

References

External links

 National Register Listings for Pinal County
 Churches in the Gila Valley Baptist Association

Churches on the National Register of Historic Places in Arizona
Churches completed in 1949
Methodist churches in Arizona
Churches in Casa Grande, Arizona
National Register of Historic Places in Pinal County, Arizona